Robyn Thurman, writing under the name Rob Thurman, is a New York Times Best Selling American novelist. To date, she has written three series and two short stories, totaling 17 books, and has been published in the US, UK, Germany, and Japan.

Her Cal Leandros series and her Trickster series share the same universe, and are classified as urban fantasy. Her Korsak Brothers series is a sci-fi thriller. In the short story anthology Wolfsbane and Mistletoe she was featured among other prominent urban fantasy writers like Charlaine Harris, Simon R. Green, Kat Richardson, and Patricia Briggs. Thurman did not reveal her gender initially, leaving the About the Author section ambiguous until the Deathwish novel in the Cal Leandros series.

Bibliography

Cal Leandros series
Nightlife (2006)
Moonshine (2007)
Madhouse (2008)
Deathwish (2009)
Roadkill (2010)
Blackout (2011)
Doubletake (2012)  
Slashback (2013)
Downfall (2014)
Nevermore (2015)
Everwar (canceled by publisher)

Trickster series
Trick of the Light (2009)
The Grimrose Path (2010)

Korsak Brothers series
Chimera (2010)
Basilisk (2011)

Other novels
All Seeing Eye (2012)

Anthologies and collections

Reception
Critical reception to Thurman's work has been mostly positive, with Romantic Times rating her books from three to four and a half stars and nominating her 2011 book Blackout for "Best Urban Fantasy" in their RT Reviewer's Choice Award contest. Monsters and Critics positively reviewed Nightlife, praising the "broad range of unlikely antagonists and protagonists". The News and Sentinel has also praised Thurman's work in their review of Doubletake.

Personal life
Thurman lives in rural Indiana.

References

External links 

Author's Livejournal

21st-century American novelists
American women novelists
American fantasy writers
Urban fantasy writers
Year of birth missing (living people)
Living people
Women science fiction and fantasy writers
21st-century American women writers